Codey Spencer Rei (born 2 February 1989) is a New Zealand rugby union player. He plays in the wing, fly-half and fullback position and is considered a utility back.

In June 2016 it was announced Rei had signed for Kobe Kobelco Steelers on a two-year contract.

Rei has captained the Chiefs development side.

He has played for ITM Cup side Taranaki as well as for North Harbour.

Rei has also been capped for New Zealand's māori international side the Māori All Blacks.

Personal 
Rei and his partner have a son, Reggie.

References

External links
 itsrugby.co.uk Profile
 Codey Rei at irb.com
 ESPN Profile

1989 births
New Zealand rugby union players
North Harbour rugby union players
Rugby union fly-halves
Rugby union wings
Rugby union fullbacks
People educated at New Plymouth Boys' High School
Living people
People from Patea
Kobelco Kobe Steelers players
New Zealand expatriate rugby union players
Expatriate rugby union players in Japan
New Zealand expatriate sportspeople in Japan
Rugby union players from Taranaki